Rakitić is a Croatian and Serbian surname.

It may refer to:

 Ivan Rakitić (born 1988), Croatian footballer
 Slobodan Rakitić (1940–2013), Serbian writer and politician.

Croatian surnames
Serbian surnames
Slavic-language surnames
Patronymic surnames